Carabus delavayi is a species of ground beetle in the genus Carabus, first described by Léon Fairmaire in 1886.

Subspecies 

 Carabus delavayi achilleanus Cavazzuti, 2002
 Carabus delavayi delavayi Fairmaire, 1886
 Carabus delavayi meonoetius Cavazzuti & Rapuzzi, 2010
 Carabus delavayi parvipes Cavazzuti, 1996
 Carabus delavayi patrikeevi Cavazzuti, 2001
 Carabus delavayi planithoracis Kleinfeld, 2006
 Carabus delavayi tenuimanus Deuve & Imura, 1990
 Carabus delavayi yunlongensis Kleinfeld, 2000
 Carabus delavayi yunxiensis Deuve & Mourzine, 2002

References

delavayi
Insects of China

Insects described in 1886